S’gaw, S'gaw Karen, or S’gaw K’Nyaw, commonly known as Karen, is a Sino-Tibetan language spoken by the S'gaw Karen people of Myanmar and Thailand. A Karenic branch of the Sino-Tibetan language family, S'gaw Karen is spoken by over 2 million people in Tanintharyi Region, Ayeyarwady Region, Yangon Region, and Bago Region in Myanmar, and about 1 million in northern and western Thailand along the border near Kayin State. It is written using the S'gaw Karen alphabet, derived from the Burmese script, although a Latin-based script is also in use among the S'gaw Karen in northwestern Thailand.

Various divergent dialects are sometimes seen as separate languages: Paku in the northeast, Mopwa (Mobwa) in the northwest, Wewew, and Monnepwa.

History
The S’gaw, commonly known as the Karen language belongs to the Karenic branch of the Sino-Tibetan language family. The S'gaw language has been used as the official language in the Kayin State of Myanmar and of the Karen National Union (KNU) organization who have waged a war against the Burmese government since early 1949. A Bible translation was published in 1853.

Distribution and varieties

S'gaw is spoken in Ayeyarwady delta area, in the Ayeyarwady, Bago, Kayin, and Rangon Regions. S’gaw speakers are frequently interspersed with Pwo Karen speakers.

S'gaw dialects are:
 Eastern dialect of S’gaw Karen (Pa’an)
 Southern dialect of Western Kayah (Dawei)
 Delta dialect of S’gaw Karen

Paku is spoken in:
 northern Kayin State: hills southeast of Taungoo in eastern Bago Region, bordering Kayin State
 southern Kayah State (also known as Karenni State).

Paku dialects are Shwe Kyin, Mawchi, Kyauk Gyi, Bawgali, the names of which are based on villages.
 Kyauk Gyi and Shwe Kyin are spoken in Taungoo District, eastern Bago Region,  near the Kayin State border.
 Mawchi is spoken in Kayah State.
 Bawgali is spoken in north Kayin State.

Mobwa is spoken in 9 villages at the western foot of the Thandaung Mountains in Thandaung township, Kayin State. There are also some in Taungoo township, Bago Region.

Mobwa dialects are Palaychi (Southern Mobwa) and Dermuha (Southern Mobwa).

Karen people in the Andaman Islands: S'gaw Karen is also spoken in the  Andaman and Nicobar Islands, Union Territory of India. The total population in the Andamans is about 2000 people, living in eight villages in the Mayabunder and Diglipur tehsils of the North and Middle Andaman district:
 Mayabunder tehsil – Webi, Deopur, Lataw, Lucknow (Burmadera), Karmatang-9 and 10
 Diglipur tehsil – Borang, Chipon

Dialects
The S'gaw Karen language has at least 3 dialects. They are mutually intelligible to each other; however, there may be words that sound unfamiliar to one another.
Northern dialect – also known as southern dialect of Kayah State is the S'gaw dialect that does not have the th sound in their language or dialect. They replace the southern and eastern dialects th with s. For example: while the southern and eastern would say moe tha boe, the northern dialect would say moe sa boe. This dialect used the Roman alphabet for their writing system.
Southern dialect and Eastern (Pa'an) dialect – these two dialects are very similar but there may be words that each may not understand due to regional location which allowed the dialects to grow apart. These two dialects use the Myanmar script as their writing system.
There are also different accents in the Karen language.

Phonology 
The following displays the phonological features of present S'gaw Karen:

Consonants 

 An aspirated fricative [] may be present among different accents and dialects.

Vowels 

Alphabet (Burmese script)

The Karen alphabet consist of 25 consonants, 9 vowels, 5 tones and 5 medials. The Karen alphabet was derived from the Burmese script as created by the help of the English missionaries around the early 1860s. The Karen alphabet was created for the purpose of translating the Bible into the Karen language. Karen script is written from left to right and requires no spaces between words, although modern writing usually contains spaces after each clause to enhance readability.

က has a sound intermediate between k and g; as in g for good
ခ is the aspirate of က. It is pronounced like kh as heard in the word camp.
ဂ has no analogue in English or German. See: voiced velar fricative
ဃ is pronounced like ch in the German bach, or the Scottish loch. 
င is pronounced like ng as heard in sing
စ has a sound intermediate between s and z.
ဆ  is the aspirate of စ. It has the sound of ssh, as heard in the phrase hiss him.
ရှ is pronounced like sh as heard in shell
ည is pronounced like ny as heard in canyon
တ has a sound intermediate between t and d; say t without air coming out
ထ  is the aspirate of တ.  It is pronounced like ht as heard in the word hot
ဒ is pronounced like d as heard in day 
န is pronounced like n as heard in net
ပ has a sound intermediate between b and p; say p without air coming out
ဖ is pronounced like p as heard in pool
ဘ is pronounced like b in ball
မ is pronounced like m as heard in mall
ယ is pronounced like y as heard in backyard 
ရ is pronounced like  r as heard in room
လ is pronounced like l as heard in school
ဝ is pronounced like w as heard in wonderful 
သ is pronounced like th as heard in thin
ဟ is pronounced like h as heard in house 
အ as a consonant, has no sound of its own; it is a mere stem to which vowel signs are attached. Vowel carrier 
ဧ is pronounced as a ɦ sound. See: breathy-voiced glottal approximant

Vowels
Vowels can never stand alone and if a word starts with a vowel syllable, use the vowel carrier "အ" which is silent in order to write words that start with vowel. 

အ –  a in quota
အါ – a in bad
အံ –  i in mean
အၢ – German ö in Göthe
အု – German ü in Glück and Korean Hangul character "ㅡ"
အူ – u in rule, oo in moon 
အ့ –  a in rate
အဲ – e in met
အိ – o in note
အီ – aw in raw

Tones
In Shraw Karen, every syllable consists of a vowel, either alone, or preceded by a single or double consonant. A syllable always ends in a vowel. Every syllable may be pronounced in six different tones of voice, the meaning varying according to the tone in which it is pronounced.

Where no tone is marked, the syllable is pronounced with a rising inflection.

Double consonants
When one consonant follows another with no vowel sound intervening, the second consonant is represented by a symbol,
which is joined to the character representing the first consonant.

The examples of writing the Karen alphabet are:
  +  → , pronounced 
  +  +  → , pronounced 
  +  + → , pronounced 
  +  + +  → , pronounced

Tones
Ken Manson (2009) proposed a Karen tone box to help understand Karenic tonal diversity and classify Karenic languages. It is similar to William Gedney's Tai tone box (see Proto-Tai language#Tones). The tone box contains diagnostic words for use during field elicitation.

Alphabet (Latin script)
The Karen Latin alphabet has 24 consonants, 9 vowels and 5 tones. The tones are written with alphabetic letters.

Consonants

 K match with the English word guard
 HK match with the English word car
 G does not have a sound similar to the European language but match with the other Karen alphabet of ဂ
 Q match with the German word bach
 NG match with the English word young
 C  match with the English ch
 HS have the same sound as S
 NY match with the Spanish letter ñ
 T have similar sound with English d but say it without air coming out
 HT match with the English word tool
 D have the same sound as English d
 N match with English N
 P have similar sound to English p but say it without air coming out
 HP match with English p
 B match with English b
 M match with English m
 Y match with English y
 R match with English r
 L match with English l
 W match with English w
 S match with English s; same sound as HS
 H match with English h
 EH has no analogue in the European languages 
 AH has no analogue in the European languages

Vowels

 A match with the Italian a
 E match with the English word rust; uh
 I match with the Italian i
 O match with the Spanish o
 U match with the Korean romanization eu
 AI match with the English word sell
 EI match with the name Jay
 AU match with the English word fault
 OO match with the English word cool

Tones

 av or ă – high mid tone
 aj or à – middle of the sound
 ax or â – low tone; low voice in a short time
 af or ä – high-pitched tone
 az or ā – even tone

Grammar

References

External links

 S'gaw Karen Grammar 
 S'gaw Karen Dictionary
 S'gaw Karen Bible
 S'gaw Karen Picture Bible
 SEAlang Library S'gaw Karen Dictionary
 Drum Publication Group
 Free Anglo-Karen Dictionary
 Drum Publication Group—Online S'gaw Karen language materials. Includes an online English – S'gaw Karen Dictionary.
 Karen Teacher Working Group—Several Karen fonts available for download.

Karen language
Karen people
Subject–verb–object languages
Tonal languages